Thomas Kellein (born 1955) is a German art historian; gallery director; author; and curator. He was the Director at Kunsthalle Basel between 1988 and 1995, and the Director of the Kunsthalle Bielefeld between 1996 and 2010. He was the Director of the Chinati Foundation between 2011 and 2012.

Early life and education 

Thomas Kellein was born in 1955 in Nuremberg, Germany. During his school years, Kellein lived in Hanover, Germany and studied art history, philosophy and literature in Berlin, Hamburg and Marburg.

In 1982, he received his doctorate degree from the University of Hamburg. His dissertation was published by Gerd Hatje in the book, Sputnikschock und Mondlandung: Künstlerische Großprojekte von Yves Klein zu Christo (1989), and additional sections appeared in his catalogue, Walter de Maria: 5 Kontinente Skulptur (1989).

Career
In 1982, he was appointed curator of the Staatsgalerie Stuttgart, where he directed the International Archive for Intermedia Arts founded by Hanns Sohm in 1945. Later he curated exhibitions, with Ad Reinhardt and then with Walter de Maria.

In 1988, he was appointed Director of the Kunsthalle Basel, where he curated exhibitions of Mark Rothko, Clyfford Still, Andy Warhol, Roni Horn, Mike Kelley, John McCracken, Cindy Sherman, Hiroshi Sugimoto, and Rachel Whiteread. He also organized thematic projects like “The 21st Century” or “World Morality: Ideas of Morality in Contemporary Art.” Several of his exhibitions traveled from Basel to various European countries and to the United States.

During his years in Basel, he was guest curator at Watari-Um in Tokyo, at the Royal Academy of Arts in London and at Haus der Kunst in Munich. There, in 1995, he curated the historically comprehensive exhibition “Pierrot: Melancholy and Mask.” Between 1982 and 1996 he was part-time lecturer and Professor for Art History at the Philipps-Universität Marburg, the Kunstakademie Stuttgart, and the Universities of Stuttgart and Freiburg.

From 1996 to 2010, Kellein served as Director of the Kunsthalle Bielefeld, turning the municipal Art Museum into a nonprofit operating company. In Bielefeld he curated exhibitions by Alvar and Aino Alto, Vanessa Beecroft, Louise Bourgeois, George Condo, Paul Delvaux, Fang Lijun, Caspar David Friedrich, Adam Fuss, Donald Judd, Ilya and Emilia Kabakov, Jeff Koons, Henri Laurens, Robert Longo, Kasimir Malevich, Yoko Ono, Pablo Picasso, Rirkit Tiravanija and Not Vital. Among his thematic projects were “1937: Perfection and Destruction,” “1968: The Great Innocence,” and “The 80s Revisited: The Bischofberger Collection.” Many publications related to the listed exhibitions, including the ones in Basel, were issued by well-known German publishing houses. There were a large number of English publications as well.

In 1997 Kellein initiated the state-sponsored project “Garden Landscape OstWestfalenLippe” in public and private gardens and parks of the region. From 2000 to 2010 the project involved up to six different spatial installations a year. Among the participating gardeners and artists were Georg Baselitz, Gilles Clément, George Condo, Richard Deacon, Olafur Eliasson, Jenny Holzer, Ilya and Emilia Kabakov, Anish Kapoor, Jonathan Meese, Christiane Möbus, Piet Oudolf, Tobias Rehberger, Thomas Schütte, Martha Schwartz, Yutaka Sone and Jan Vercruysse. Several of the spatial installations, such as those by Jenny Holzer in the palace grounds of Reder, are accessible as permanent installations. In the Gräflicher Park Bad Driburg, the “Piet Oudolf Garden” has been open to the public since 2009.

From 2011 until 2012, he served as Director of the Chinati Foundation in Marfa, Texas. The 340-acre estate comprises more than thirty buildings, which the American sculptor Donald Judd (1928-1994), through grants since 1979 from the Dia Art Foundation, filled with art installations to found his own museum. H With the help of the architectural firm of Zwimpfer Partner, Kellein had invited Donald Judd to Basel in 1991, where the sculptor developed the design of the façade of the Bahnhof Ost railroad station.

From 2012 to 2013 Kellein was an independent art advisor. Starting in 2013, he was Director of Art Consult at Bergos Berenberg AG in Zurich, a Swiss private bank. In 2015, Kellein gave testimony in the court case connected to Berenberg Art Advice (a now dissolved subsidiary of the private Berenberg Bank), because his former co-worker, art dealer Helge Achenbach was accused of defrauding customers through hidden premiums.

Publications 
A list of select exhibition catalogues and book publications, in descending order by year of publish.

Books

Exhibition catalogues

References 

Living people
1955 births
German art historians
People from Hanover